Clifford Essex (1869 – 2 February 1946) was an English banjoist, teacher, and instrument manufacturer during the Victorian and Edwardian eras.

Biography

Essex formed a partnership with Alfred D. Cammeyer in 1883 and sold banjos under the brand "Essex and Cammeyer",  in Piccadilly, London, before establishing his own firm in 1900, as Clifford Essex And Co, in Soho, the company that would eventuate into a private entity under varying titles, existing until 1977. The Company was revived after a long hiatus in 2007, by former employee and prominent banjoist Clem Vickery. Essex manufactured banjos and mandolins, wrote books on playing the banjos, performed in various bands, in particular "The Clifford Essex Banjo Band", described as a banjo orchestra and gave music lessons in London from 1883 until his death around 1946.
 
In 1903 he founded BMG magazine, an initialism for Banjo, Mandolin and Guitar which is still being published in England.

He died at his home in Wimbledon on 2 February 1946; he was 87.

References

External links
 Clifford Essex Co.
 BMG magazine

Banjo makers
Banjo manufacturing companies
English banjoists
1869 births
Musicians from London
Place of birth missing
Musical instrument manufacturing companies of the United Kingdom
1946 deaths